Axel Stoll (30 October 1948 – 28 July 2014) was a far-right esoteric German geophysicist and conspiracy theorist. He wrote many books, including Hochtechnologie im Dritten Reich and Das Wissen um die unterdrückte Physik - Ein Buch von Axel Stoll, combining pseudo-science and various conspiracy theories, especially concerning Nazi Germany.
He received notoriety through the publication of internet videos.

Vice described him as "probably Germany's best known conspiracy theorist".

Conspiracy theories

Second World War 

Several of Axel Stoll's conspiracy theories centered on World War II. He thought that Germany colonized the moon after the defeat of the Wehrmacht.

Aldebaran and the Races 

Axel Stoll thought that the Aryan race actually are aliens from the star Aldebaran and that the earth is a jail planet for those who did wrong. In his opinion, all races are fighting for superiority.

Publications 
Axel Stoll wrote a large number of books dealing mainly with his theories around war technology and physics.

References

German geophysicists
Far-right politics in Germany
1948 births
2014 deaths
German conspiracy theorists